You Need a Mess of Help to Stand Alone may refer to:

 "You Need a Mess of Help to Stand Alone" (song), a song by The Beach Boys
 You Need a Mess of Help to Stand Alone (album), an album by St. Etienne